The Servant Girl's Legacy is a 1914 American silent comedy film featuring Mabel Paige and "Babe" Hardy. Produced by Lubin Manufacturing Company, this short is the earliest surviving film performance of the comedian Hardy.

Plot

Cast
 Mabel Paige as Mandy Spraggs
 Babe Hardy (Oliver Hardy) as Cy Whitfield
 Ed Lawrence as Pa
 Eloise Willard as Ma
 Marguerite Ne Moyer as Bess
 Frances Ne Moyer as Grace
 Raymond McKee as Tim
 Royal Byron as Jim
 Bert Tracy as Messenger

See also
 List of American films of 1914
 Oliver Hardy filmography

References

External links

1914 films
1914 comedy films
1914 short films
American silent short films
American black-and-white films
Films directed by Arthur Hotaling
Silent American comedy films
American comedy short films
1910s American films